(Karl) Heinrich/Harry (Ferdinand) Rosenbusch (24 June 1836 – 20 January 1914) was a German petrographer.

Harry Rosenbusch was born in Einbeck.  He taught at Heidelberg University (1877–1908), where he founded the Mineralogisches-geologisches Institut.  He died, aged 77, in Heidelberg.

Literary works 
 Mikroskopische Physiographie der petrographisch wichtigen Mineralien, 1873
 Mikroskopische Physiographie der Mineralien und Gesteine, 4 Vols., 1873-1877
 Elemente der Gesteinslehre, 1898
 Mikroskopische Physiographie (4th ed., Stuttgart, 1909, 2 vols.)

References

External links

  — He is mention a number of times in the article specifically: "the more basic minerals precede the less basic; ... is known as Rosenbusch's law" (p. 330).
 Microscope after Fuess-Rosenbusch introduced as first German petrographic microscope, Berlin approx. 1880

1836 births
1914 deaths
19th-century German geologists
People from Einbeck
Wollaston Medal winners
Foreign associates of the National Academy of Sciences
Members of the Göttingen Academy of Sciences and Humanities